Micheloni is an Italian surname, derived from the given name Michele. Notable people with the surname include:

Egidio Micheloni (born 1913), Italian footballer
Louis Antony Micheloni (1878–?), Uruguayan physician, fencer, and philatelist
Pacifico Tiziano Micheloni (1881–1936), Italian bishop and missionary

Italian-language surnames
Patronymic surnames
Surnames from given names